The following is a timeline of the history of the city of Porto Alegre, in the state of Rio Grande do Sul, Brazil.

Prior to 20th century

 1743 - Porto dos Cazaes founded by Azoreans.
 1770 - Settlement becomes official residence of governor ; renamed "Porto Alegre."
 1773 - Câmara Municipal (town council) convenes.
 1779 -  (church) construction begins.
 1789 -  built.
 1803 - Porto Alegre becomes a vila.
 1807 - Capital of Portuguese colonial Sao Pedro do Rio Grande moves to Porto Alegre from Rio Grande.(pt)
 1822 - Porto Alegre attains city status.
 1824 -  (residence) built.
 1825 - German immigrants arrive.
 1827 -  newspaper begins publication.
 1854 -  (bridge) built.
 1858 -  and São Pedro Theatre founded.
 1864 - Horse-drawn tram begins operating.(pt)
 1869 - Public Market built.
 1871 -  (library) founded.
 1872
  (urban transport entity) formed.
 Population: 43,998.
 1878 - Sociedade Filarmônica Porto Alegrense (musical group) formed.
 1881 -  (international exposition) opens.
 1890 -  becomes mayor.
 1892 -  newspaper begins publication.
 1895 - Correio do Povo newspaper begins publication.
 1898 - Velodrome built.
 1900 - Population: 73,574.

20th century

 1901
 Town Hall of Porto Alegre (city hall) built.
  (learned society) founded.
  (exposition) held.
 1903 - Grêmio Foot-Ball Porto Alegrense founded.
 1906
 Porto Alegre general strike.
  (regional archives) headquartered in city.
 1908 - Electric tram begins operating.(pt)
 1909 - Sport Club Internacional (football club) founded.
 1908 -  (art school) founded.
 1910 - Roman Catholic Archdiocese of Porto Alegre established.
 1913 - Population: 150,343.
 1920 -  (learned society) founded.
 1921 -  built.
 1925
  (musical group) formed.
 newspaper begins publication.
 1927 -  (auditorium) opens.
 1928
  (power plant) commissioned.
 Bank of the Rio Grande do Sul established.
  (cinema) opens.(pt)
 1934 - Universidade de Porto Alegre established.
 1935
 Farroupilha Park opens.
 20 September: Farroupilha Revolution centennial fair opens.
 1937 - Usina do Gasômetro 384-foot chimney erected.
 1940 -  built.
 1941 - Flood.
 1950
  (prison) begins operating.
 Orquestra Sinfônica de Porto Alegre (musical group) formed.
 Population: 394,151.
 1954
  (children's library) founded.
 Estádio Olímpico Monumental (stadium) opens.
 1955
 Porto Alegre Book Fair begins.
 Rio Grande do Sul Museum of Art opens.
 1958
  built for the Legislative Assembly of Rio Grande do Sul.
 Porto Alegre Botanical Garden opens.
 1959
 Centro Histórico, Porto Alegre neighborhood created.
  begins operating.
 1960
  (hi-rise) built.
 Population: 641,173.
 1961 - Federal University of Health Sciences of Porto Alegre founded.
 1963 - 1963 Summer Universiade sport contest held in city.
 1964 - Zero Hora newspaper begins publication.
 1969 - Estádio Beira-Rio (stadium) opens.
 1970
 Hospital de Clínicas de Porto Alegre inaugurated.
 Population: 903,175.
 1972 - Rebuilding of Metropolitan Cathedral completed.
 1974 - Monument to the Azoreans erected.
 1976
 27 April: Fire.
 City joins the newly formed  (regional city association).
 1978 -  (library) established.
 1979 -  (museum) founded.
 1985
 Porto Alegre Metro begins operating.
 November:  held.
 1988 -  (city archives) founded.
 1989 - Participatory budgeting begins.
 1991 - Population: 1,263,239.
 1997 -  (art exhibit) begins.
 1999 - City website online (approximate date).
 2000
 City joins the União das Cidades Capitais Luso-Afro-Américo-Asiáticas (city association).
  abolished.

21st century

 2001 - January: First World Social Forum of counter-hegemonic globalizers meets in Porto Alegre.
 2002 - World Social Forum meets again in Porto Alegre.
 2003 - World Social Forum meets yet again in Porto Alegre.
 2005 -  begins.
 2010 - José Fortunati becomes mayor.
 2011 - 25 February:  occurs in Cidade Baixa.
 2012 - Arena do Grêmio (stadium) opens.
 2013 - Parada Gráfica (cultural event) begins.
 2014 - June: Part of 2014 FIFA World Cup (football contest) held in Porto Alegre.
 2016
 October:  held.
 Population: 1,481,019.
 2017 -  becomes mayor.

Images

See also
 History of Porto Alegre
 List of mayors of Porto Alegre
 
 History of classical music in Porto Alegre
  (regional archives)

References

This article incorporates information from the Portuguese Wikipedia and Spanish Wikipedia.

Bibliography

in English
 
 
 

in Portuguese

External links

Porto Alegre
Porto Alegre
Years in Brazil
History of Rio Grande do Sul